Grove Street may refer to: 
Grove Street (Camden County, New Jersey)
Grove Street (Hudson County, New Jersey)
Grove Street Cemetery
Grove Street Elementary School
"Grove St. Party", a 2011 song by Waka Flocka Flame
Magpie Lane, Oxford, a lane in England's historic university town of Oxford; known as "Grove Street" from the late 19th century until the late 1920s
A historic street in New York City's West Village, part of the larger Greenwich Village
A fictional street in the 2004 video game Grand Theft Auto: San Andreas and the 2013 video game Grand Theft Auto V, which is the namesake of the Grove Street Families gang in the former

See also
Grove Street station (disambiguation)